A Resurrection (also titled The Sibling) is an American horror-thriller film written and directed by Matt Orlando. The film stars Mischa Barton, Michael Clarke Duncan and Devon Sawa. On 12 November 2012 a trailer was released. The film premiered in Sherman Oaks, Los Angeles on 19 March 2013. This was followed by a limited theatrical release in the United States on 22 March 2013.

Plot
Set during a single day and night at a high school, Jessie (Barton), a guidance counselor, Addison (Duncan), the school principal and local police officer, Travis (Sawa) are the central characters of a "whodunit" as murder sweeps the school. Jessie attempts to help a mentally disturbed student, Eli, who is convinced that his dead brother will return and seek vengeance against the high school students that played a part in his death. His brother was killed after being run-over in a car allegedly driven by the group of high school students. Eli takes his brother's body to a witch who implants a spirit in the corpse. The witch informs Eli that his brother's spirit will rise after six days and will only rest again after committing six murders.

Cast
Devon Sawa as Travis Blair
Mischa Barton as Jessie Parker
Michael Clarke Duncan as Addison
J. Michael Trautmann as Eli Driggers
Stuart Stone as Nick Morris
Nick Jandl as Brandon Marshall
Matt Willig as Vince Marshall
Antonio Costa as Ignacio
Alanna Romansky as Tammy Juback
Morgan Wolk as Dian Packett
Brenden Meers as Alex Tiemens
Annie Kitral as The Bruja
Patrick de Ledebur as Devon Driggers
Jason McCune as Sheriff Kent
Alonzo Jimenez as Farmer

Production
The film shot for 20 days, mainly at the former Knoxville Middle School in Pittsburgh.

During post-production, the film's co-star, Michael Clarke Duncan, died of a heart attack.

Certain scenes evoke comparisons with the Sandy Hook Elementary School shooting which took place during post-production. Orlando acknowledged this; “As we were making it, Sandy Hook did not happen yet. Do I think I have a responsibility in the entertainment business to think about that? Yes, I do.”

Reception
The film was reviewed positively by the horror-genre specialist website, Shock Till You Drop. Tyler Doupe praised the cast's performances; ″Sawa turned in a good performance, as Travis. And Mischa Barton successfully broke the mold of the roles we’ve seen her play time and again. The late Michael Clark Duncan was excellent as the high school principal.″ Doupe also praised the resourceful use of the low budget, noting that ″The film feels like a movie that was made for a lot more money than what was actually spent...It takes true creativity to stretch a micro budget into anything more than that, and Matt Orlando stretched his budget very effectively.″ Doupe also commented that ″A Resurrection did a good job of leaving certain aspects of the film up to the viewer to figure out. We are not spoon fed every detail and audiences appreciate that. We respect filmmakers that trust their viewers to put the pieces together themselves.″ He continued; ″the premise is primarily unique. I like the way that Matt Orlando's script mixed reality with aspects of occult spirituality and kept the viewer wondering how the two were ultimately going to work together.″

Legacy

Issues surrounding the production of this film would ultimately make a major impact in an unexpected area—college basketball. Pittsburgh-based financial adviser Marty Blazer used money from some of his clients, which included professional athletes, to help finance the film. The Securities and Exchange Commission alleged that he had defrauded five clients out of $2.35 million in order to fund this film and other entertainment projects. Facing federal criminal charges stemming from this episode, he became an FBI informant in a major investigation of corruption in college basketball. The first wave of indictments stemming from this investigation were announced in fall 2017, and by March 2018 more than 35 NCAA Division I men's programs were potentially implicated in NCAA rules violations.

References

External links
 
 

American horror thriller films
American independent films
Films shot in Pennsylvania
Resurrection in film
2013 films
2013 horror films
2013 directorial debut films
2010s English-language films
2010s American films